Emily Robinson (born October 18, 1998) is an American actress, director and producer.

Biography
Robinson began her career modeling at age six after her neighbor introduced her to Ford Models who then represented her. At the age of seven, Robinson wanted to start acting and taped her first television commercial. Robinson started working in front of a live audience in Saturday Night Live when she was eight. She has since made a total of eight appearances on the show. 

In 2010, Robinson made her off-Broadway debut in Horton Foote's epic The Orphans' Home Cycle at the Signature Theatre in New York, directed by Michael Wilson. She played the roles of Lily Dale, Molly and Irma Sue. The Wall Street Journal called the plays, which were performed in repertory, "the most significant theatrical event of the season, the kind of show you tell your grandchildren you saw." A special Drama Desk Award was presented to the cast, creative team and producers.

Robinson continued to work in theatre and has worked with Austin Pendleton, director, A Loss of Roses at the Cherry Lane Theatre, Linda Lavin and James Lecesne in Mother of Invention, and helped create the role of Tessa in Brindlebeast, a new musical by Anita Riggio.

Robinson's television credits include: Transparent (Amazon), Rizzoli & Isles (TNT), Criminal Minds (CBS), Scorpion (CBS), The Following (FOX), CSI: NY (CBS), Person of Interest (CBS), A.N.T. Farm (Disney), Saturday Night Live (NBC), Late Night with Jimmy Fallon (NBC) and The Guiding Light (CBS).

At the age of 17 in 2016, Robinson wrote, directed and starred in the short film, 'Virgin Territory' about a queer teenage girl's sexual awakening.

Also in 2016, Robinson was in "Broken Vows" with Wes Bentley and Jaimie Alexander.

In 2017, Robinson was in "Once Upon a Time in Venice" alongside Jason Momoa, John Goodman and played the role of Taylor, Bruce Willis' niece.

In 2018, alongside Marisa Tomei and Timothy Olyphant, Robinson played the role of Charlie Plummer's love interest in the movie called Dark Was The Night. Robinson and Plummer went to middle school together.

In 2020, Robinson starred in the short film, "Oleander" about a teen girl who creates her own provocative sex-positive YouTube channel. The film won Best Director for Short Film at The Method Fest and was an official selection at the 2020 LA Femme International Film Festival.

Robinson studied creative writing at Columbia University and graduated in 2020.

Filmography

Film

Television

References

External links 

1998 births
Living people
American film actresses
Actresses from New York City
American child actresses
American television actresses
21st-century American actresses
American stage actresses
Columbia College (New York) alumni